József Pokorny (17 July 1882 – 17 March 1955) was a Hungarian international footballer. At club level, he played for Ferencvárosi TC. He made five appearances for the Hungarian national team, scoring five goals.

External links
 
 

Association football midfielders
Hungarian footballers
Hungary international footballers
Ferencvárosi TC footballers
Place of death missing
1882 births
1955 deaths
Footballers from Budapest